The Dhirubhai Ambani International School (DAIS) is a private co-educational LKG-15 dayschool in Mumbai, Maharashtra, India, built by Reliance Industries, named after the late patriarch of the conglomerate, Dhirubhai Ambani. The school was established in 2003 and has been an IB World School since January 2003. It offers the International Baccalaureate Program in its Diploma form. Nita Ambani, wife of Mukesh Ambani is the chairperson of the school.

The school prepares students for the Indian Certificate of Secondary Education, the IGCSE and the IB Diploma examinations.

System of education

Primary School (CIPP): LKG to Class 5
The Primary School programme comprises Lower and Upper Kindergarten (LKG and UKG) years and classes I to V. In classes LKG to V, the school follows an integrated curriculum by drawing on teaching programmes of the Council for the Indian School Certificate Examinations and international examination boards. The school is a member of the Cambridge International Primary Programme.

Middle School (CLSP): Classes 6 and 7
The Middle School Programme i.e. classes 6 and 7. The Cambridge Lower Secondary Programme is followed by the school.

Secondary school
The school offers the following in class VIII, where students prepare for the programme that they will study in classes IX and X: ICSE Programme and 
IGCSE Programme.

Post Secondary School
Dhirubhai Ambani International School has been an IB World School since January 2003. It offers the IB Diploma Programme.

Facilities

The school building is seven storied with lawns, landscaped gardens and playgrounds. The school premises house  of teaching space containing classrooms and laboratories.

Every classroom has a public address system, display and writing boards, lockers for students, broadband Internet access and air conditioning. There is schoolwide Wi-Fi internet access for the students of grades 8-10 affiliated with the IGCSE board and its 11th and 12th graders. There are laboratories for Physics, Chemistry and Biology and teaching rooms for Art, Music, Social Science, Languages, Computer Studies, and Mathematics.

The school has a Learning Centre with access to periodicals and audio-visual resources, the internet and photocopying/printing facilities. The school has a terrace garden for its art students and a performing arts centre with sound proof walls and professional AV technology. It shares a playground with the American School of Bombay with an astroturf, tennis and basketball courts for outdoor sports.  The Dhirubhai Ambani International School Study and Activity Centre situated in Matheran, 100  km from Mumbai, opened in 2008. It is used for cross-curricular, recreational activities as well as for weekend training camps and Physical Education activities.

Student Council
The school has four houses: Panthers (Blue), Tigers (Green), Jaguars (Red) and Lions (Yellow). Each house has two house captains, one sports captain, one house coordinator, two vice house captains, one vice sports captain, and two cub captains. Recently, the post of a middle school coordinator has also been added.

The council Core positions are Head Boy, Head Girl, two Student Council Coordinators, two Sports Coordinators, one Round Square Student Committee Chair and two Vice Student Council Coordinators and one Vice Sports Coordinator. The council is non-democratic (members are selected by the teachers and outgoing captains). The council is usually changed in October each year.

Model United 
The school hosts an annual Model United Nations (MUN) conference called The Dhirubhai Ambani International Model United Nations (DAIMUN) in October. The conference is one of two conferences in India to be affiliated with The Hague International Model United Nations (THIMUN) Foundation.

Activities and achievements
 The Dhirubhai Ambani International Model United Nations (DAIMUN) is hosted by the school.
 The Paigaam Peace Conference works towards building harmonious cross border relationships.
 Global Membership of Round Square (2008)
 Member of the Council of International Schools (CIS) (2008)
 Best ICSE school in India

Social initiatives
 Students work with Indian NGOs such as IDF, Advitya, Akanksha, CCDT, Muktangan, Pratham, Eve, Dr. Bhau Daji Lad Museum, Village Project, Maharashtra Nature Park, Goonj and Ishara. The Dhirubhai Ambani International School Akanksha Centre has been set up as part of this programme.
 "DAISight" is a student-initiated organization in affiliation with Lotus Eye College and the Mumbai Eye Care Campaign. DAISight towards improving and spreading awareness of eyecare around Mumbai.
 "Across the Road" is a service project supporting children in slum areas adjacent to the school in educational and developmental needs.
 The "Village Project", born in 2009, and called Empowering Rural India, is a school project where villages are adopted with the objective of eradicating poverty and unemployment through a three-pronged strategy – Education, Infrastructure and Empowerment. This helps the school achieve the UN Millennium Development Objectives as well as the IB Mission goals: "Think Globally and Act Locally." The school tries to improve means of income generation, empower women and allowing them to contribute to the household income, and implement the infrastructure for health care, education, and communication. The two villages are Hassachipatti and Kumbharghar.

See also
 List of schools in Mumbai

References

External links
School Website

International schools in Mumbai
International Baccalaureate schools in India
Private schools in Mumbai
2003 establishments in Maharashtra
Educational institutions established in 2003
Round Square schools
High schools and secondary schools in Mumbai